Heidi Elizabeth VanDerveer (born February 11, 1964) is a women's basketball collegiate and professional coach. She is currently the women's basketball head coach at UC San Diego.

A native of Chautauqua, New York, VanDerveer was a four-year letter-winner in basketball at the College of Charleston, serving as team captain as a senior and graduating with a bachelor's degree in political science and English in 1986. She also has a master's degree in physical education and sports psychology from the University of Tennessee.

VanDerveer began her coaching career as a graduate assistant at Tennessee under Pat Summitt, where she helped guide the Volunteers to the 1987 NCAA National Championship and the Final Four in 1988. She then served as an assistant at South Carolina for six seasons, before taking the head coaching role at Eastern Washington.

VanDerveer made the jump to the WNBA in 1997, joining the staff of the Sacramento Monarchs. She was elevated to head coach in the middle of the season after the firing of Mary Murphy and served in that role the following year. She became an assistant for the Minnesota Lynx in 1999, and took over as head coach after the resignation of Brian Agler in 2002.

VanDerveer came back to the college ranks and was the video coordinator at Stanford for one season. She worked as an assistant at San Francisco for the 2004-05 season. She had to briefly serve as the acting head coach at San Francisco after Mary Hile-Nepfel was unable to perform her day-to-day duties due to medical restrictions.  She returned to the WNBA in 2006 as an assistant with the Seattle Storm, before serving as the associate head coach at San Diego State for Beth Burns.

In 2008, she became the head coach at Occidental College. In her four years at Oxy, she led the Tigers to a SCIAC regular season title every year and won the conference tournament twice. In 2012, VanDerveer was named the head coach of the UC San Diego women's basketball team.

She is the younger sister of Tara VanDerveer, the longtime head coach of the Stanford's women's basketball team.

Head coaching record

College

WNBA

|-  
| align="left" |Sacramento*
| align="left" |1997
|13||5||8|||| 3rd in Western||—||—||—||||
|- 
| align="left" |Sacramento
| align="left" |1998
|30||8||22|||| 4th in Western ||—||—||—||||
|-
| align="left" |Minnesota**
| align="left" |2002
|13||4||9|||| 8th in Western ||—||—||—||||
|-class="sortbottom"
| align="left" |Career
| || 56||17||39||||  ||—||—||—||||

* VanDerveer took over as interim head coach after Mary Murphy was fired with a 5-10 record. Sacramento's total record in 1997 was 10-18.
** VanDerveer took over as interim head coach after Brian Agler was fired with a 6-13 record. Minnesota's total record in 2002 was 10-22.

References

External links

 WNBA Coach Profile
 April 7, 2008 Occidental College press release
 Heidi VanDerveer Bio from USCD

1964 births
Living people
American women's basketball coaches
Basketball coaches from New York (state)
Basketball players from New York (state)
College of Charleston Cougars women's basketball players
Eastern Washington Eagles women's basketball coaches
Minnesota Lynx head coaches
Minnesota Lynx coaches
Occidental Tigers women's basketball coaches
People from Chautauqua, New York
Sacramento Monarchs coaches
San Francisco Dons women's basketball coaches
Seattle Storm coaches
South Carolina Gamecocks women's basketball coaches
Tennessee Lady Volunteers basketball coaches
UC San Diego Tritons women's basketball coaches
University of Tennessee alumni